Shaista is a given name of Pashtun origin. The name is given to females.

The name originates from the Pashto word, Shaist, meaning “beauty”. 

Through Pashtun influence, this name can be found across Central and South Asia, along with some parts of the Middle East.

Notable people with this name include:
 Shaista Aziz, English journalist
 Shaista Khan, Mughal subahdar of Bengal
 Shaista Lodhi, Pakistani actress
 Shaista Nuzhat, Punjabi linguist
 Shaista Pervaiz, Pakistani politician
 Shaista Shameem, Fijian lawyer
 Shaista Suhrawardy Ikramullah, Pakistani politician
 Shaista Wahab, Afghan author

See also 
Shaista Khan Mosque, a mosque in Dhaka built by Shayesta Khan
Shaistaganj Upazila, a sub-district in Bangladesh named after Syed Shaista Miah